Vítor Hugo Silva Azevedo (born 3 July 1992), known as Vitinha, is a Portuguese footballer who plays for G.D. Ribeirão as a midfielder.

External links

1992 births
Living people
People from Vila Nova de Famalicão
Portuguese footballers
Association football midfielders
Liga Portugal 2 players
Segunda Divisão players
G.D. Ribeirão players
C.D. Trofense players
Portugal under-21 international footballers
Sportspeople from Braga District